Harry Stockman may refer to:

Harry Stockman (loyalist) (born 1961), Northern Irish loyalist
Harry Stockman (racing driver) (1919–1994), American racecar driver